Vsyo idyot po planu (Everything is going according to plan) is the eighth studio album by Soviet/Russian punk band Grazhdanskaya Oborona. The album was recorded and released in 1988 by Yegor Letov in Omsk. It was the first album from the 1988 album series (with «Tak zakalyalas' stal», and «Boyevoy stimul»). The title track of this album was one of the band's most popular songs.

Background 
In 1987 Letov immediately left the city with his then-partner, the fellow Siberian songwriter Yanka Dyagileva, and spent the entire year in hiding, hitch-hiking across the country until the prosecution was stopped in December 1987 with the help of Letov's relatives. In winter 1988 Letov returned home and recorded three more albums (also released under the name of Grazhdanskaya Oborona) in his home "studio", known as "GrOb Records". In the same year the reunited band started touring across the USSR.

The title track «Vsyo idyot po planu» (Everything is going according to plan) became much more famous than its author. The song was conceived as a confession of a simple Soviet citizen who came home tired. He sees the world around him and sings about this terrible world. The lyrics of the album have an acute social and political mood. Letov sang all the songs and played all the instruments, but Kuzya UO and Oleg Sudakov took part in the song as backing vocalists.

Track listing

Personnel

Grazhdanskaya Oborona 
 Yegor Letov – vocals, guitars, bass guitar, drums, production
 Oleg Sudakov  – backing vocals
 Konstantin Ryabinov (Kuzya UO) – backing vocals

Technical
 Yegor Letov – art design, photography
 Sergey Letov – remastering
 Natalia Chumakova  – remastering

References

External links 
 Vsyo idyot po planu at Discogs (list of versions)
 Album on official cite

1988 albums
Grazhdanskaya Oborona albums